Ski jumping at the 2007 Winter Universiade includes four ski jumping events.

Medal table

Women's events

Individual K95

2007 Winter Universiade
Winter Universiade
2007